Mario Voigt (born 8 February 1977) is a German politician of the Christian Democratic Union (CDU) who has served as a leader of the CDU in the Landtag of Thuringia since 2020. He has been a member of the Landtag since 2009. He previously served as co-deputy leader of the Thuringian CDU from 2014 to 2020, and general-secretary of the party from 2010 to 2014.

Early life and education
Voigt obtained his Abitur in 1995 at the Ernst-Abbe-Gymnasium in his home city of Jena. From 1995 to 1996 he did Zivildienst (community service) at the Friedrich Schiller University Hospital. He then studied political science, public law and modern history at the universities of Jena, Bonn, and Charlottesville in the United States from 1997 to 2003. He received his PhD in political science at the Chemnitz University of Technology in 2008. He received a scholarship from the Konrad Adenauer Foundation.

Professional career
Voigt has worked for the political representative office of Siemens in Brussels, the political planning department of the CDU in Berlin, and the office of the Konrad Adenauer Foundation (KAS) in Washington. In 2004, he spent several months as an election observer in the United States on behalf of the KAS. At the end of 2007, he took over as head of corporate communications and investor relations for the Jena-based company Analytik Jena. He left the company in late 2009. 

As a strategy consultant for the McCann-Erickson advertising agency, Voigt assisted the CDU during the 2005 federal election campaign. Since then, he has been involved in public affairs campaigns from the local to the international level in the areas of mobilization and digital campaigning. During the 2017 federal election campaign, he was the CDU's strategy consultant for mobilization. That same year, he was hired as a professor for digital transformation and politics at Quadriga Hochschule Berlin GmbH.

Political career
Voigt joined the Young Union and the CDU in 1994. From 1999 to 2000, he was the first East German to become chairman of the Circle of the Christian Democratic Students. He was elected to the executive for the CDU's Saale-Holzland-Kreis district association in 2000, and became chairman in 2015. He was also elected to the district council in 2000 and chaired the CDU faction there from 2009 to 2011. From 2002 to 2009, he was a deputy member of the European People's Party executive. From 2005 to 2010, he was chairman of the Young Union's Thuringia branch.

Voigt was elected to the Landtag of Thuringia in the 2009 election, winning the constituency of Saale-Holzland-Kreis II with 36.9% of votes cast. He served as chairman of the Committee on Education, Science, and Culture during the 2009–14 parliamentary term. He was re-elected to the Landtag in 2014 with 41.2% of votes, and again in 2019 with 34.1%. From 2014–19 he was the CDU faction's spokesman for business, science, and digitisation.

Voigt was elected general-secretary of the CDU Thuringia in November 2010. He left this position in 2014 after being elected as one of three deputy leaders of the party. 

After the resignation of Mike Mohring in February 2020, Voigt was elected as leader of the CDU Landtag group in March. In November 2020, Voigt was nominated unanimously as the CDU executive's preferred candidate to lead the party in the planned 2021 Thuringian state election, though plans for the early election were ultimately scrapped.

Voigt was nominated by his party as delegate to the Federal Convention for the purpose of electing the President of Germany in 2022.

Since 2022, Voigt has been serving as deputy chair – alongside Serap Güler – of a working group in charge of drafting the CDU’s new party platform, under the leadership of Carsten Linnemann.

Political positions
When the CDU/CSU entered into a coalition government with the center-left Social Democratic Party (SPD) on the national level following the 2013 elections, Voigt joined a group of young party members – including Günter Krings, Michael Kretschmer and Jens Spahn – in signing an open letter which called for changes in the CDU’s policies and leadership.

Ahead of the Christian Democrats’ leadership election in 2022, Voigt publicly endorsed Friedrich Merz to succeed Armin Laschet as the party’s chair.

Controversy
As chairman of the Young Union (JU) in Thuringia during the 2009 state election, Voigt oversaw the group's "stop Ramelow" campaign. The association distributed media over the internet and in public targeting Bodo Ramelow and the Left party, the CDU's primary opposition. Activists also attended and disrupted Ramelow's campaign events. These actions were conducted by members without disclosing their political affiliation in order to avoid damaging the reputation of the CDU. During the course of the campaign, a local court forbade the JU from producing material which made false claims about Ramelow, such as claiming that he believed East Germany was not an Unrechtsstaat, that he wanted to reintroduce DDR-era administrative districts, or that he wanted to abolish Gymnasiums. Information about the JU's campaign strategy was leaked by WikiLeaks.

In September 2022, the State Parliament’s Committee on Legal Affairs lifted Voigt’s immunity amid investigations by the public prosecutor's office into his business activities.

References

1977 births
Living people
Christian Democratic Union of Germany politicians
Members of the Landtag of Thuringia
21st-century German politicians
Chemnitz University of Technology alumni
People from Jena